Moreleta Park is a suburb of Pretoria, South Africa, situated  southeast of the city centre. According to the 2011 census, it has a population of 27,539.

Moreleta Park is a suburban area with the majority of people commuting to work elsewhere; e.g. Johannesburg. It has a broad mixture of properties including office parks, retail shopping centers, hospitals, churches, upmarket single stand housing, gated security complexes, as well as typically smaller and higher density residential units built within an outer wall that forms a security barrier. There is also an informal settlement called "Plastic View" within the borders of the suburb. This poverty stricken settlement does not receive much noted support from the local council. Some local charities are reaching out to these residents from time to time.

The Moreleta Kloof Nature Reserve contains African wild life; zebras, springbok and other small antelope and ostriches may be observed. Entrance is free of charge and it is the best place for Sunday Morning Walk.

Moreleta Park falls under the City of Tshwane Metropolitan Municipality.

Name and History 
Moreleta is situated on and was eventually a sub-division of one of the first farms in Pretoria, owned by Daniel Erasmus. His daughter's name was Aletta (Letta) Erasmus, and she used to do the washing in the river running through their farm, now known as Moreleta Spruit (spruit = small river in Afrikaans). As Letta used to do washing by the river passers by used to greet her "Môre Letta" (‘Good morning Letta’ in Afrikaans), and that is according to folklore how Moreleta got its name.

References

Suburbs of Pretoria